Afroaster is a genus of flowering plants belonging to the family Asteraceae.

Its native range is Tanzania to Southern Africa.

Species:

Afroaster ananthocladus 
Afroaster bowiei 
Afroaster chimanimaniensis 
Afroaster comptonii 
Afroaster confertifolius 
Afroaster erucifolius 
Afroaster hispidus 
Afroaster laevigatus 
Afroaster lydenburgensis 
Afroaster milanjiensis 
Afroaster nubimontis 
Afroaster peglerae 
Afroaster perfoliatus 
Afroaster pleiocephalus 
Afroaster pseudobakerianus 
Afroaster serrulatus 
Afroaster tansaniensis 
Afroaster zuluensis

References

Astereae
Asteraceae genera